Footlights Theater is a 30-minute American television anthology series that aired on CBS on Fridays in the summers of 1952 and 1953 as a replacement for Our Miss Brooks. 

The program was broadcast on Friday nights from July 4, 1952, to September 26, 1952, and from July 3, 1953, to September 25, 1953. A total of 22 episodes were produced live in New York City and were directed by Fletcher Markle and Robert Stevenson (director). Some of its scripts were original and some were adapted from novels. The first season in 1952 was broadcast live, while the second season in 1953 was filmed rather than broadcast live.

Episodes
August 15, 1952 - "The Big Hello" - Cesar Romero, Jeanne Cagney, Raymond Burr, Kathryn Card

Notable guest stars
Lloyd Bridges
Richard Carlson
Broderick Crawford
Ellen Drew
Edmund Gwenn 
Barbara Hale
Ruth Hussey
Anita Louise
Mercedes McCambridge
Maureen O'Sullivan
George Reeves
Tommy Rettig
Gale Storm
Gig Young

References

External links

 List of episodes at CVTA

1952 American television series debuts
English-language television shows
1950s American anthology television series
1953 American television series endings
CBS original programming
American live television series
Black-and-white American television shows